Panta (possibly from Quechua for a kind of mantilla) also known as Chachacumayoc (possibly from Quechua chachakuma a kind of plant, -yuq a suffix), is a  mountain in the Vilcabamba mountain range in the Andes of Peru. It is located in the Cusco Region, La Convención Province, on the border of the districts of Inkawasi and Vilcabamba. Panta lies east of Choquesafra.

References

Mountains of Peru
Mountains of Cusco Region